Abtwil may refer to

 Abtwil, Aargau, Switzerland
 Abtwil, a village in the municipality of Gaiserwald, St. Gallen, Switzerland